The volcanism of New Zealand has been responsible for many of the country's geographical features, especially in the North Island and the country's outlying islands.

While the land's volcanism dates back to before the Zealandia microcontinent rifted away from Gondwana 60–130 million years ago, activity continues today with minor eruptions occurring every few years. This recent activity is primarily due to the country's position on the boundary between the Indo-Australian and Pacific Plates, a part of the Pacific Ring of Fire, and particularly the subduction of the Pacific Plate under the Indo-Australian Plate.

New Zealand's rocks record examples of almost every kind of volcanism observed on Earth, including some of the world's largest eruptions in geologically recent times.

None of the South Island's volcanoes are active.

Major eruptions

New Zealand has been the site of many large explosive eruptions during the last two million years, including several of supervolcano size. These include eruptions from Macauley Island and the Taupō, Whakamaru, Mangakino, Reporoa, Rotorua, and Haroharo calderas.

Two relatively recent eruptions from the Taupō Volcano are perhaps the best known. Its Oruanui eruption was the world's largest known eruption in the past 70,000 years, with a Volcanic Explosivity Index (VEI) of 8. It occurred around 26,500 years ago and deposited approximately 1,200 km³ of material. Later erosion and sedimentation had long-lasting effects on the landscape, causing the Waikato River to shift from the Hauraki Plains to its current course through the Waikato to the Tasman Sea. New Zealand's largest lake, Lake Taupō, fills the caldera formed in this eruption.

Taupō's most recent major eruption, the Taupō or Hatepe eruption, took place around 232 CE, and is New Zealand's largest eruption since Oruanui. It ejected some 120 km³ of material (rating 7 on the VEI scale), with around 30 km³ ejected in just a few minutes. This makes it one of the most violent eruptions in the last 5000 years (alongside the Tianchi eruption of Baekdu at around 1000 and the 1815 eruption of Tambora). The resulting ash turned the sky red over Rome and China.

Mount Tarawera's eruption around 1310 CE, while not nearly as large, was still substantial, producing 2.5 km³ of lava and 5 km³ of tephra (VEI 5). Because its deposits, stretching from Gisborne to the Bay of Islands, were emplaced around the time that Māori permanently settled New Zealand, they have provided a useful archaeological marker. Approximately 2 km³ of tephra was erupted (VEI 5).

Hazards
As well as the direct effects of explosions, lava, and pyroclastic flows, volcanoes pose various hazards to the New Zealand populace. These include tsunamis, break-out floods and lahars from volcanically dammed lakes, ashfall, and other far field effects.

For instance, the Tangiwai disaster occurred on 24 December 1953 when the Tangiwai railway bridge across the Whangaehu River collapsed from a lahar in full flood, just before an express train was about to cross it. The train could not stop in time, and 151 people died. This was ultimately caused by Ruapehu's 1945 eruption, which had emptied the crater lake and dammed the outlet with tephra.

Effects can be widespread even for eruptions of only moderate size. Ash plumes from Ruapehu's 1996 eruption forced the closure of eleven airports, including Auckland International Airport.

Insurance against volcanic damage (along with other natural disasters) is provided by the country's Earthquake Commission.

Cultural references

The Māori had many myths and legends regarding the land's volcanic mountains. Perhaps the most well known regards the relative locations of Taranaki, Tongariro and Pihanga. It holds that the two first-named volcanoes competed for the love of the beautiful Pihanga and, after Tongariro succeeded, the defeated Taranaki moved to its lonely location near New Plymouth.

Another legend recounts the exploits of Ngātoro-i-rangi, a tohunga (priest) who arrived from the ancestral Māori homeland, Hawaiki, on the Arawa waka (canoe). Travelling inland and then looking southward from Lake Taupō, he decided to climb the mountains he saw there. He reached and began to climb the first mountain along with his slave Ngāuruhoe, who had been travelling with him, and named the mountain Tongariro (the name literally means 'looking south'), whereupon the two were overcome by a blizzard carried by the cold south wind. 
Near death, Ngātoro-i-rangi called back to his two sisters, Kuiwai and Haungaroa, who had also come from Hawaiki but remained on Whakaari / White Island, to send him sacred fire, which they had brought from Hawaiki. This they did, sending the fire in the form of two taniwha (powerful spirits) named Te Pupu and Te Haeata by a subterranean passage to the top of Tongariro. The tracks of these two taniwha formed the line of geothermal fire that extends from the Pacific Ocean and beneath the Taupō Volcanic Zone, and is seen in the many volcanoes and hot springs extending from Whakaari to Tokaanu and up to the Tongariro massif. The fire arrived just in time to save Ngātoro-i-rangi from freezing to death, but Ngāuruhoe had already died by the time Ngātoro-i-rangi turned to give him the fire. For this reason the hole through which the fire ascended, the active cone of Tongariro, is now called Ngauruhoe.

Eruptions in the North Island, such as the Kaharoa eruption of Mt Tarawera in 1314, have been used to help determine the approximate date of arrival of the early Polynesian colonists to about 1280. Fossilized footprints of perhaps second- or third-generation Polynesian colonists have been found in volcanic ash on islands in the Hauraki Gulf.

Geology

Please see the main articles above because as already mentioned almost every kind of volcanism observed on Earth is found in New Zealand. For historic intrusive volcanism please see the section on older volcanism below. There is good evidence for continued intrusive volcanism activity in the central North Island. A quite recent, large dioritic pluton of the order of 550,000 years old has been dated from drill cores there.

Volcanic areas

While there are remnants of volcanic activity throughout most of New Zealand, there are several areas where they are more obvious, and somewhere activity continues. Since Taranaki's last activity in 1854, all eruptions have been in the Taupō Volcanic Zone or the Kermadec Arc.

Kermadec Arc
The Kermadec Islands are an active volcanic island arc stretching north-northeast from New Zealand's North Island towards Tonga. While only a few volcanoes in the arc are tall enough to form islands, it includes about 30 sizeable submarine volcanoes with many in the South Kermadec Ridge Seamounts at the New Zealand end of the chain. The largest island, Raoul Island, produced a large eruption around 2200 years ago with a VEI of 6. Its activity has continued intermittently since, with its latest eruption occurring in 2006.

Chatham Islands
The higher portions of the Chatham Islands are formed from volcanic rock that is up to 81 million years old, although lava flows on the northern shore of Chatham Island date back only about five million years.

Solander Islands 
The Solander Islands, a small chain of uninhabited islets close to the western end of the Foveaux Strait, are the emergent portions of a large extinct andesitic volcano that last erupted around 150,000 to 400,000 years ago. Caused by the subduction of the Australian Plate beneath the Pacific Plate, it is the only volcano associated with this subduction zone that protrudes above the sea.

Subantarctic islands
The majority of New Zealand's widely separated subantarctic islands are primarily volcanic in origin, including Auckland Island, Campbell Island / Motu Ihupuku, and Antipodes Island. These are mainly Miocene intraplate volcanoes with ages decreasing towards the northeast, although Antipodes Island may have been active during the last 20,000 years.

Older volcanism

Older remnants of volcanism are also found in several places around New Zealand. These were generally formed either when New Zealand still formed part of the Gondwana supercontinent, or while Zealandia was rifting away from the rest of Gondwana, although some have been emplaced in their current setting more recently. (New Zealand is the main part of the submerged microcontinent of Zealandia that currently emerges above the sea.)

A band of granitic intrusions covering over 10,000 km2, the Median Batholith, stretches from Stewart Island / Rakiura through Fiordland, and again through the West Coast and Nelson after interruption by the Alpine Fault. This was produced between 375 and 105 million years ago in the course of subduction-related volcanism in a long mountain range along the Gondwanan coast somewhat like today's Andes. Two more batholiths, the Karamea-Paparoa and Hohonu Batholiths, are also found on the West Coast.

Basaltic lava flows, dikes, and tuff from fissure eruptions between 100 million and 66 million years ago, during Zealandia's separation from Gondwana, are found in Marlborough, the West Coast and offshore further west. Ultramafic intrusions are found in Marlborough and north Canterbury, including at the summit of Tapuae-o-Uenuku, the country's highest mountain outside the Southern Alps / Kā Tiritiri o te Moana. The Mount Somers volcanics that erupted from 100 to 80 million years ago extend to Banks Peninsula but are mostly buried there by more recent volcanism.

Rhyolitic ignimbrite and tuff deposits found in Otago at Shag Point / Matakaea and in the Kakanui Mountains that were originally dated in the range 107 to 101 million years ago are now both dated to 112 ± 0.2 million years ago and so likely come from a large singe event. 

The Hikurangi Plateau is an oceanic plateau on the Pacific Plate that attached to the Chatham Ridge after being partially subducted under it, and is now subducting under the North Island. It likely formed in one of the world's largest volcanic outpourings, the greater Ontong Java event.

Ophiolites, volcanic deposits from the ocean floor, have been incorporated into the continental basement of New Zealand in the Dun Mountain Ophiolite Belt, found at both ends of the South Island, and in Northland.

See also

 North Island surface volcanism (for more geology details)
 South Island surface volcanism (for more geology details)
 Geothermal areas in New Zealand
 List of disasters in New Zealand by death toll
 List of earthquakes in New Zealand
 List of volcanoes in Antarctica (for volcanoes in New Zealand's Ross Dependency)
 List of volcanoes in New Zealand

Notes

References
 Dench, Alison; Essential Dates: A Timeline of New Zealand History, Auckland: Random House, 2005

External links
 Geonet: NZ's geological hazard monitoring system
 GNS Science: NZ Government research site
 Earthquake Commission

Geographic areas of seismological interest
Articles containing video clips
Back-arc basins
Subduction volcanoes
Volcanic belts
+
Rift volcanoes
Rift volcanism
Volcanoes of New Zealand
Volcanism of Zealandia